Dadli-ye Qazneyn (also Romanized as Dādlī-ye Qazneyn and Dādlī-ye-Ghazneyn; also known as Dādlī-ye Qarneyn) is a village in Palizan Rural District, in the Central District of Maraveh Tappeh County, Golestan Province, Iran. At the 2006 census, its population was 264, in 57 families.

References 

Populated places in Maraveh Tappeh County